Nagrakata Assembly constituency is an assembly constituency in Jalpaiguri district in the Indian state of West Bengal. It is reserved for scheduled tribes.

Overview
As per orders of the Delimitation Commission, No. 21 Nagrakata Assembly constituency (ST) covers Nagrakata community development block, Matiali community development block and Banarhat II and Chamurchi gram panchayats of Dhupguri community development block.

Nagrakata Assembly constituency is part of No. 2 Alipurduars (Lok Sabha constituency) (ST).

Members of Legislative Assembly

Election results

2021

In the 2021 West Bengal Legislative Assembly election, Puna Bhengra of BJP defeated his nearest rival Joseph Munda of TMC.

2016

In the 2016 West Bengal Legislative Assembly election, Sukra Munda of TMC defeated his nearest rival Joseph Munda of Congress.

2011

In the 2011 West Bengal Legislative Assembly election, Joseph Munda of Congress defeated his nearest rival Sukhmoith Oraon of CPI(M).

1977-2006
In the 2006 state assembly elections, Sukhmoith (Piting) Oraon of CPI(M) won the 21 Nagrakata (ST) seat defeating his nearest rival Shankar Barik of Congress. Contests in most years were multi cornered but only winners and runners are being mentioned. Chaitan Munda of CPI(M) defeated Ganesh Oraon of Trinamool Congress in 2001, Victor Lakra of Congress in 1996 and Bhadeya Oraon of Congress in 1991. Sukra Oraon of CPI(M) defeated Bhadea Oraon of Congress in 1987. Punai Oraon of CPI(M) defeated Tuna Oraon of Congress in 1982 and Hemraj Bhagat of Congress in 1977.

1962–1972
Prem Oraon of CPI won in 1972. Punai Oraon of CPI(M) won in 1971. Budhu Bhagat of Congress won in 1969, 1967 and 1962. In 1957 Mangru Bhagat of CPI and Budhu Bhagat of Congress won the Mal (ST) joint seat.

References

Assembly constituencies of West Bengal
Politics of Jalpaiguri district